The Gathering Ireland 2013, referred to as The Gathering  was a tourism-led initiative in Ireland. It aimed to mobilise the Irish diaspora to return to Ireland during 2013 to be part of specially organised local gatherings and events during the year. It was a government supported initiative driven primarily by Fáilte Ireland, the National Tourism Development Authority, and Tourism Ireland. The concept relied on grassroots initiatives of private individuals, and non-governmental organisations. The Gathering was not a single event but provided an umbrella framework for varied activities throughout 2013, from family reunions and clan gatherings to sports fixtures. While the initiative was primarily directed at the Irish diaspora, and those with other links to the country, the organisers hoped the experience for the general tourist would also be enhanced.

It began on 1 January 2013 and ended on 31 December 2013.

Background
The concept for The Gathering Ireland 2013 first emerged at the 2009 Global Irish Economic Forum held in Farmleigh, Dublin. The Forum had two broad objectives: to examine ways in which the Republic could develop more strategic relationships with its diaspora; and to provide a platform for those living overseas who claim Irish ancestry to contribute to the Republic’s economic recovery. The Gathering Ireland 2013 was seen as an opportunity to address both of these objectives, the latter achieved through additional overseas visitors and tourism revenue, which in turn may stimulate job creation.

Criticism
The initiative has been publicly criticised by entrepreneur Michael O'Leary and actor Gabriel Byrne. In a broad criticism of fiscal policy at a Dublin conference, O'Leary referred to the initiative as "The Grabbing", though he went on to say "We like, actually, the Gathering. I thought it wasn’t a bad idea. There’s no reason not to welcome everyone back to Ireland". 
Byrne, who previously served as a cultural ambassador for Ireland, said many Irish emigrants in the US felt abandoned by the Government and described the initiative as "a scam".

See also
Tourism in Ireland
List of tourist attractions in Ireland
Fáilte Ireland
Homecoming Scotland 2009

References

External links
Official Web site - www.thegatheringireland.com The website of The Gathering Ireland 2013
Official Web site - www.leitrimrootsfestival.com The website of The Leitrim Roots Festival 2013

Tourism in Ireland
Tourism campaigns
2013 in Ireland